The South African Army Armour Formation provides an Armour capability to the South African Army. The Formation came into being as part of a restructure. South African Armour Corps units previously under the command of various different brigades and other formations were all grouped under one formation. All armour is assigned to the SA Army Armour Formation under the charge of a General Officer Commanding.

History

Armoured Origins
South Africa employed armoured cars as early as 1915 during its invasion of the then-German South West Africa (now Namibia). 

After the end of the First World War a single Medium Mark A Whippet light tank was purchased for the Union Defence Force and was operationally employed during the 1922 Rand revolt. The tank in question is now on display at the Army College at Thaba Tshwane. 

The formation of an armoured corps was proposed in 1924. An armoured car section was formed the next year when two Vickers machine gun-armed Crossley armoured cars and two medium tanks were imported from Britain.

During the severe economic depression of 1933, the government established the Special Service Battalion (SSB) on 1 May 1933 as a job opportunities and social upliftment project. The Springbok was first used as symbol for this unit until it was changed to the national flower - the Protea - in July 1934, which is still used today.

World War Two
The SSB was converted to an Armoured Car Regiment at the start of the Second World War, and later to a Tank Regiment. In April 1943 the SSB was deployed in North Africa and used a black beret sporting silver proteas as badge and a flash with orange, white and blue as its colours.

Armoured Corps
When the SA Armoured Corps was officially proclaimed in 1946 and the SSB included in the corps as the only full-time unit, its symbols and colours were incorporated

Armoured Formation
On 24 January 2014 the General Officer Commanding (GOC) SA Army Armour Formation, Brigadier General Chris Gildenhuys  handed over command to Brigadier General Andre Retief  at a parade at the Tempe Military Base in Bloemfontein.

The South African Army Armour Formation marked its 70th anniversary in October 2016 in Bloemfontein with the fourth Armour Symposium and a thanksgiving service.

Insignia

Structure
The Formation is structured as follows:

Training
School of Armour, (Bloemfontein)

Tank units
These units are equipped with the Olifant Mk1B or Olifant Mk2 main battle tank.

Regular Force
1 South African Tank Regiment (Bloemfontein)

Reserve Force
Pretoria Armoured Regiment (Pretoria)
Queen Nandi Mounted Rifles (Durban)
Thaba Bosiu Armoured Regiment (Bloemfontein)

Armoured Car Units
These units are equipped with the Rooikat and Ratel ZT-3's armoured fighting vehicle.

Regular Force
1 Special Service Battalion (Bloemfontein)

Reserve Force
Umvoti Mounted Rifles (Pinetown)
Blaauwberg Armoured Regiment (Cape Town)
Johannesburg Light Horse Regiment (Sandton)
Molapo Armoured Regiment (Potchefstroom)

Equipment

Tank Variants

Armoured Car Variants

References

External links
 SA Army Armour Formation
 SA Armour Museum

South African administrative corps
Armoured units and formations of South Africa
Military units and formations established in 1999
1999 establishments in South Africa
Nationstate armoured warfare branches